Marina Towers may refer to:
 Marina Towers (Beirut), a residential building complex in Beirut
 Marina City, a mixed-use residential/commercial building complex in Chicago
 The Tower, Meridian Quay, Swansea referred to as Marina Tower during pre-planning
 Marina Towers Observatory, in Swansea
 Marina Tower Melbourne, a mixed-use development in Melbourne, Australia